Paul Lester Overstreet (born March 17, 1955) is an American country music singer and songwriter. He recorded 10 studio albums between 1982 and 2005, and charted 16 singles on the Billboard country charts, including two No. 1 hits. He has also written singles for several other country acts, including No. 1 hits for Randy Travis, Blake Shelton, and Keith Whitley, as well as hits for The Judds and Kenny Chesney.

Life and career
Overstreet was born in Vancleave, Mississippi, the son of Mary Lela (Havens) Hatten and William E. Overstreet, a minister, and was raised in Newton. Prior to his solo success, he was one third of the trio S-K-O, in which he recorded one studio album before departing and being replaced with Craig Bickhardt. Overstreet's sons, Nash and Chord, are also musicians. Nash is the lead guitarist for the pop band Hot Chelle Rae, while Chord played Sam Evans on Glee and signed with Island Records in 2016.

Songwriter
During his songwriting career, primarily in the country genre, Overstreet has written or co-written 27 Top Ten songs. During this time, he has won two Grammy Awards and also won ACM and CMA Song of the Year Awards (1987 and 1988). Overstreet was named the BMI Songwriter of the Year five straight years, from 1987 to 1991, an achievement on music row that has not been achieved before or since. He co-wrote "A Long Line of Love", "Love Can Build a Bridge", and "Forever and Ever, Amen". Other well-known hits of recent years he is known for are "She Thinks My Tractor's Sexy" by Kenny Chesney and "Some Beach" by Blake Shelton, which was a Number One hit in 2004.

Paul Overstreet is best known for writing country songs such as "Forever and Ever, Amen" and "On the Other Hand", both of which were Number Ones for Randy Travis. He also co-wrote "When You Say Nothing at All" which was a Number One hit at the end of 1988 for Keith Whitley, and later a Top Five hit in 1995 for Alison Krauss, and revived later in 1999 by Ronan Keating of Boyzone.  He is also known for writing the worship song God Is Good All The Time with Don Moen, which has become one of Moen's signature songs.

In 2019 he partnered with upcoming singer/songwriter Marcus King to write the song Beautiful Stranger.

Singer
Overstreet was first signed as a singer in 1982. His debut single, "Beautiful Baby", peaked at No. 76 on the country charts that year, and was the first single from his self-titled debut album. After co-writing Tanya Tucker's 1987 single "I Won't Take Less Than Your Love" with Don Schlitz, Overstreet and fellow singer-songwriter Paul Davis became guest vocalists on the song, which became a Number One hit that year.

Also in 1987, Overstreet founded the trio S-K-O (also known as Schuyler, Knobloch & Overstreet) with Thom Schuyler and J. Fred Knobloch, both former solo singers. S-K-O charted three singles with Overstreet as a member, including the Number One "Baby's Got a New Baby". After one album the trio was renamed S-K-B when Overstreet left and was replaced by Craig Bickhardt.

In 1988, Overstreet signed to RCA Nashville as a solo artist. His second solo album, Sowin' Love, accounted for five straight Top 10 hits on the country charts: "Love Helps Those", the title track, "All the Fun", "Seein' My Father in Me" and "Richest Man on Earth." His second album, 1990's Heroes, produced his only solo Number One in its lead-off single "Daddy's Come Around", which was followed by the Top Tens "Heroes" and "Ball and Chain". However, his chart success soon waned, with "If I Could Bottle This Up" peaking at No. 30 and "Billy Can't Read" falling short of Top 40. A third RCA album, Love Is Strong, produced the No. 22 "Me and My Baby" and two more singles which missed the Top 40. Also, the song "There But for the Grace of God Go I" won a Dove Award for Country Recorded Song of the Year at the 24th GMA Dove Awards in 1993. Three years later, Overstreet released his first album for Scarlet Moon Records, Time. It produced his last single to enter the country charts, "We've Got to Keep on Meeting Like This," which peaked at No. 73.

In 2013, Overstreet starred in a TV pilot titled Nashville Unplugged Live taped in Las Vegas and produced and directed by Michael A. Bloom.  Also starring with Overstreet was songwriter Danny Myrick.

Solo discography

Albums

Studio albums

Compilation albums

Singles

As featured artist

Music videos

Songwriting

References

External links
 Official website
 CMT: Paul Overstreet

1955 births
American country singer-songwriters
Grammy Award winners
Living people
People from Newton, Mississippi
RCA Records Nashville artists
S-K-O members
Singer-songwriters from Mississippi
American performers of Christian music
Country musicians from Mississippi